Bertram Beierlorzer (born 31 May 1957 in Neunkirchen am Brand) is a German football coach and former player. As a player, he spent nine seasons in the Bundesliga with 1. FC Nürnberg, FC Bayern Munich and VfB Stuttgart. While at Bayern he won two league titles and three Cups, but an injury suffered in the 1982 DFB Cup Final caused him to miss Bayern's defeat in that year's European Cup final.

He is the older brother of Achim Beierlorzer.

Honours
 Bundesliga: 1984–85, 1985–86
 DFB-Pokal: 1981–82, 1983–84, 1985–86
 DFB-Pokal runner-up: 1984–85

References

External links
 

1957 births
Living people
Association football defenders
German footballers
Germany under-21 international footballers
Germany B international footballers
Bundesliga players
2. Bundesliga players
1. FC Nürnberg players
FC Bayern Munich footballers
VfB Stuttgart players
German football managers
Footballers from Bavaria
People from Forchheim (district)
Sportspeople from Upper Franconia